The 1992 Purex Tennis Championships was an Association of Tennis Professionals men's tennis tournament held in Scottsdale, Arizona in the United States that was part of the World Series of the 1992 ATP Tour. It was the fifth edition of the tournament and was held from February 24 to March 2, 1992. Unseeded Stefano Pescosolido won the singles title.

Finals

Singles

 Stefano Pescosolido defeated  Brad Gilbert 6–0, 1–6, 6–4
 It was Pescosolido's only singles title of the year and the 1st of his career.

Doubles

 Mark Keil /  Dave Randall defeated  Kent Kinnear /  Sven Salumaa 4–6, 6–1, 6–2 
 It was Keil's only title of the year and the 1st of his career. It was Randall's only title of the year and the 1st of his career.

References

External links
 ITF tournament edition details

Tennis Channel Open
 
Purex Tennis Championships
Purex Tennis Championships
Purex Tennis Championships
Purex Tennis Championships
Tennis Channel Open